Josh Shaw (born September 7, 1979) is a former American football defensive tackle. He was drafted by the San Francisco 49ers in the fifth round of the 2002 NFL Draft. He played college football at Michigan State.

Shaw has also played for the Miami Dolphins, Oakland Raiders and Denver Broncos.

References

External links
Denver Broncos bio
Oakland Raiders bio

1979 births
Living people
Players of American football from Fort Lauderdale, Florida
American football defensive tackles
Michigan State Spartans football players
San Francisco 49ers players
Miami Dolphins players
Oakland Raiders players
Denver Broncos players
New York Dragons players